The Naked Gun media franchise, also known as Police Squad!, consists of several American crime spoof-comedies, based on an original story written by the comedy filmmaking trio Zucker, Abrahams and Zucker. The installments include one television series, and three theatrical films. The plot centers around a police detective with a lot of heart, despite being less-than intelligent. Leslie Nielsen stars in each installment in the protagonist role of Det. Sgt. Franklin "Frank" Drebin, with a fourth film starring Liam Neeson as Frank Drebin Jr. in active development as of 2022.

The franchise was met with mostly positive critical reception, and the films were a financial box office success. As of 2021, Seth MacFarlane is developing a sequel.

Television

Police Squad! (1982)

An American crime spoof-comedy television series that was broadcast through the American Broadcasting Company (ABC) network in 1982. The series starred Leslie Nielsen in the first franchise installment as Franklin "Frank" Drebin, and was co-created/written by David Zucker, Jim Abrahams, and Jerry Zucker. Parodying police procedurals, the series featured the use of sight gags, wordplay and non sequiturs. Although the show was canceled after six episodes, it was later followed by the successful film series, and in 2013 TV Guide ranked it #7 on its list of 60 shows that were "Cancelled Too Soon".

Film

The Naked Gun: From the Files of Police Squad! (1988)

Detective Frank Drebin (Leslie Nielsen) tries to uncover a plot to assassinate Queen Elizabeth II, who is on a state visit to the USA. The main suspect is Vincent Ludwig, a rich businessman (Ricardo Montalbán), who uses a hypnotic device to turn others into murderers. As with previous ZAZ spoof comedies, the plot was mostly culled from another—more serious—movie. In this case, it was Telefon wherein people were triggered into assassins via hypnotic phone calls (indeed, dialogue in the post-hypnotic suggestion demonstration scene is copied word-for-word from Telefon).

On the case, Drebin falls in love with Ludwig's assistant, Jane Spencer (Priscilla Presley). She knows nothing about Ludwig's plot, and after the pair spends the night together, Jane helps with Frank's investigation.

The Naked Gun 2½: The Smell of Fear (1991)

Frank discovers that Jane's new boyfriend, Quentin Hapsburg (Robert Goulet), is involved in an evil plan to kidnap Dr. Albert S. Meinheimer (Richard Griffiths), a scientist whom President George H. W. Bush (John Roarke) has chosen to determine a new national energy policy. Hapsburg plans to kidnap the real Dr. Meinheimer and replace him with a lookalike named Earl Hacker (also portrayed by Griffiths) who will endorse an energy policy according to the dictates of the energy lobby.

Naked Gun 33⅓: The Final Insult (1994)

In the third film of the series, Frank is married to Jane, and he has retired from Police Squad. The film introduces the criminal Rocco Dillon (Fred Ward), who is stuck in prison. He is contacted by someone called Papshmir to be given a target for a bombing. Frank is pulled out of retirement. He goes undercover pretending to be a prisoner named "Nick 'the Slasher' McGurk Jr., III" at the jail where Dillon is being held, and they break out of jail. Outside they are escorted by Dillon's gangster mother (Kathleen Freeman) to his country retreat, where Frank also meets Rocco's voluptuous moll (Anna Nicole Smith). The gang plots to blow up the Academy Awards. When Jane arrives looking for Frank, she is taken hostage.

Future
In 2009, it was revealed that a fourth movie starring Leslie Nielsen was coming out as a direct-to-TV sequel, and that it was going to be about Frank train a young rookie. The film was given the title The Naked Gun 4: Rhythm of Evil. The script was apparently believed to be really funny, but due to financial reasons, it was canned. The script was written by Alan Spencer. The original writers of the first movie, the Zucker-Abrahams-Zucker team tried to stop it from happening. According to Alan Spencer, he signed on to write the film as a “rescue mission” to save an inferior sequel from happening. The script impressed the Paramount executives that it was briefly moved to development for theatrical release. Spencer wrote a sizable role for Leslie Nielsen, who would be passing the torch to a new generation of incompetent cops, but the studio asked him to reduce Nielsen's part to a cameo for budgetary reasons, before opting to remove the character altogether. Spencer left the project following the request and the movie entered development hell, ultimately never being realized.

In December 2013, Paramount Pictures announced that a reboot of The Naked Gun franchise was in development with Ed Helms cast in the role of Frank Drebin, while the script was being co-written by Thomas Lennon and R. Ben Garant. By January 2014, Garant revealed that the working title of the project is "Episode IV: A New Hope", while announcing that it is intended to be a sequel to the original films. Helms was intended to portray a character that introduces himself as "Frank Drebin, no relation" so that the movie can introduce a new protagonist without contradicting what came before. In March 2015, David Zucker stated that he was offered a producing role on the project, but had denied being involved as he felt like it would differ in comedic style and ultimately be inferior to his original films. In August 2015, Helms confirmed that the script was still being written, while acknowledging the concerns that Zucker had with modern-day audience reception, and a need for something other than the spoof genre of the previous movies. By March 2017, a re-write of the script was being completed by David Zucker and Pat Proft, with the plot being reworked to feature the son of Frank Drebin.

In January 2021, it was announced that Seth MacFarlane had been hired to further develop the project. After MacFarlane had previously expressed interest in casting Liam Neeson as Frank Drebin Jr. in 2015, the filmmaker was hired by the studio. Neeson revealed that the filmmaker alongside Paramount Pictures had approached him with a pitch to star in the movie. In June of the same year, Neeson stated that MacFarlane was working on a new draft of the script, with the studio additionally negotiating the filmmaker's potential role as director. He expressed excitement for the project and the opportunity to explore a more comedic role, should he decide to star in the movie; while stating that development on the project is ongoing. In February 2022, Neeson again confirmed that Paramount is still courting him to star in the legacy sequel.

In October 2022, the film was officially greenlit with Neeson in the lead role. Directed by Akiva Schaffer, Dan Gregor, and Doug Mand, who were also hired to write a new draft of the script from a previous draft with contributions from Mark Hentemann and Alec Sulkin. Seth MacFarlane and Erica Huggins will serve as producers, with a production start date pending. The project will be a joint-venture production between Paramount and Fuzzy Door Productions. Principal photography is tentatively scheduled for summer 2023.

Video games

The Naked Gun: ICUP (2012)
The Naked Gun: ICUP, a point and click and adventure game, was released by Gamecentric Media and Paramount in 2011. The story and concept were penned by Robert LoCash, a writer of the third Naked Gun film. A press release by Gamecentric about the read "Spoofing modern crime dramas and lampooning popular video games, THE NAKED GUN: ICUP is designed as a continuation of the classic film franchise for the digital age. The game will be serialized over six episodes starting this fall with a new episode debuting monthly. Each episode will be fully voice-acted by top Hollywood talent to deliver a classic story-driven adventure supported by the itemized incentive structure of current popular social network games." Due to Leslie Nielsen's death in 2010, voice actor A. J. Locascio took over as Frank Drebin Jr., the son of the original character.

The game received an average score of 60 on the review aggregator Metacritic.

Recurring cast and characters

Additional crew and production details

Reception

Box office performance

Critical and public response

References

External links

 
 
 
 
 
 
 

 
Film series introduced in 1988
English-language films
American slapstick comedy films
American film series
American parody films
American screwball comedy films
Trilogies
Paramount Pictures franchises
Comedy franchises